Kalman Samuels (born Kerry, September 7, 1951) is the founder of Shalva, the Israel Association for the Care and Inclusion of Persons with Disabilities. Non-denominational and free of charge, Shalva offers services to individuals with disabilities from infancy to adulthood and their families.  Shalva provides a range of therapies, inclusive educational frameworks, recreational activities, vocational training as well as respite and family support.  Shalva advocates for the inclusion of persons with disabilities through employment programs, community initiatives, and research. Samuels published a personal memoir in May 2020 called "Dreams Never Dreamed" telling the story of his personal journey of self-discovery and the establishment of Shalva.

Early life 

Kalman was raised in a non-observant Jewish home in Vancouver, British Columbia, Canada where he attended Sir Winston Churchill High School. Upon his graduation in 1969 he was given academic and basketball scholarships to the University of British Columbia. After his first year studying philosophy he traveled Europe with plans to undergo coursework in France. However his mother requested that he stop in Israel to visit relatives. Enamored with Jewish culture and heritage, he cancelled the trip to France and enrolled in several yeshivot, and in 1977 he received his rabbinical ordination.

Marriage and birth of Yossi 

In 1973 Samuels married Malki Klein and the couple took up residence in Jerusalem. In 1977, their second son, Yossi Samuels, at the time 11 months old, was injured by a faulty DPT vaccination and was rendered blind, deaf and acutely hyperactive.
After 7 years with no communication, Shoshana Weinstock, Yossi's special education teacher, achieved a breakthrough by relaying sign language into the palm of his hand, teaching Yossi his first word, 'Shulchan' (Hebrew, שֻׁולְחָן), meaning table.  Malki vowed that if Yossi could be helped, she would dedicate herself to helping other children with disabilities and their families.

Founding and expansion of Shalva 

Due to their challenges raising Yossi without adequate support, Malki and Kalman established an afternoon playgroup for children with disabilities. Over time, the program expanded to meet the needs of a broader spectrum of disabilities, from birth through adulthood. Today, Shalva offers a constellation of therapeutic interventions, family support, inclusive educational frameworks, social and recreational programs and vocational training to individuals with disabilities.
In recognition of Shalva's accomplishments and an ongoing need to expand the availability of special needs services, the Jerusalem Municipality provided the organization with a seven acre property adjacent to the planned Route 16 highway and the Shaarei Tzedek Medical Center in the Beit HaKerem neighborhood of Jerusalem. 
In September 2016, Shalva opened the Shalva National Center in Jerusalem and has since become an international leader in the field of disability care; housing some of Israel's largest and most advanced facilities for persons with disabilities.

Prizes and acknowledgments 
 1994 – President of Israel Prize for Excellence
 1999 – Mayor of Jerusalem's Award for Exceptional Service
 2004 – Shalem Foundation Award as "Israel's Most Unique Program for the Mentally Challenged"
 2005 – Knesset Speaker's Quality of Life Prize for Leadership & Public Excellence
 2006 – The Jerusalem Foundation Teddy Kollek Prize
 2007 – Aminadav National Service Award for Excellence
 2009 – Jerusalem's Award of Distinction for National Service Volunteers
 2010 – SHALEM Foundation Award 
 2012 – The Ministry of Education Outstanding Volunteer Award
 2018 - Sylvan Adams Nefesh B'Nefesh Bonei Tzion Prize
 2018 - Lions International, Israel's Man of the Year Award
 2019- Honorary Doctor of Philosophy from Bar-Ilan University
 2019- Esteemed Fellowship from Ruppin Academic Center
 2019- Jerusalem Prize for Dedication on Behalf of People with Disabilities
 2020- Yakir Yerushlayaim Honored Citizen of Jerusalem Award
2022- Lighting of Torch at Israel's 74th Independence Day Torch-Lighting Ceremony

Books 

 'Dreams Never Dreamed: A Mother's Promise That Transformed Her Son's Breakthrough into a Beacon of Hope" (a memoir): The Toby Press, April 2020.
 'Halomot SheLo Halamti: Al Ahava, Ometz VeShinui - Siporei Hayehem Shel Meyased 'Shalva' UVeno Yossi' (Hebrew edition): The Toby Press, October 2019.

References

1951 births
Living people
Medical and health organizations based in Israel
Volunteer organizations in Israel
Jews and Judaism in Israel
Bonei Zion Prize recipients